Rhys Morgan is an activist.

Rhys Morgan may also refer to:

Rhys Morgan (cricketer), New Zealand cricketer
Rhys Morgan (rugby union)
Rice Morgan, MP, also spelt Rhys Morgan

See also

 Morgan Rhys (disambiguation)
 
 Morgan (disambiguation)
 Rhys